The 1945 All-Ireland Senior Camogie Championship Final was the fourteenth All-Ireland Final and the deciding match of the 1945 All-Ireland Senior Camogie Championship, an inter-county camogie tournament for the top teams in Ireland.

The game was tied at half-time, 2-2 each, but Antrim finished stronger to make up for the previous year's disappointment.

References

All-Ireland Senior Camogie Championship Finals
All-Ireland Senior Camogie Championship Final
All-Ireland Senior Camogie Championship Final
All-Ireland Senior Camogie Championship Final